Mpwapwa District is one of the seven districts of the Dodoma Region of Tanzania. It is bordered to the north by Kongwa District (site of the failed British groundnut scheme), to the east by Morogoro Region, to the south by Iringa Region, and to the west by Chamwino District. Its district capital is the town of Mpwapwa.

According to the 2012 Tanzania National Census, the population of Mpwapwa District was 305,056.

According to the 2002 Tanzania National Census, the population of the Mpwapwa District was 254,500.

Geography 
Most Mpwapwa residents live on the central plateau at about 3,500 ft above sea level, though others, mainly from the minority Hehe ethnic group, live atop the 7,000 ft mountains that benefit from better rainfall. The district is fairly arid and only gets good rains 2 years out of every 7.

Transport
Paved trunk road T5 from Dodoma to Iringa passes through the southern part of the district.

The central railway of Tanzania passes through Mpwapwa District as well, with one station being located in Gulwe.

Administrative subdivisions
As of 2012, Mpwapwa District was administratively divided into 30 wards.

Wards

 Berege
 Chipogoro
 Chitemo
 Chunyu
 Galigali
 Godegode
 Gulwe
 Ipera
 Iwondo
 Kibakwe
 Kimagai
 Kingiti
 Lufu
 Luhundwa
 Lumuma
 Lupeta
 Malolo
 Massa
 Matomondo
 Mazae
 Mbuga
 Mima
 Mlunduzi
 Mpwapwa
 Mtera
 Nghambi
 Pwaga
 Rudi
 Vingh'awe
 Wotta

References

Districts of Dodoma Region